The Florina gas field natural gas field located on the continental shelf of the Black Sea. It was discovered in 2010 and developed by Sterling Resources. It will begin production in 2015 and will produce natural gas and condensates. The total proven reserves of the Florina gas field are around 77 billion cubic feet (2.2 km³), and production is slated to be around 11 million cubic feet/day (0.31×106m³) in 2015.

References

Black Sea energy
Natural gas fields in Romania